The 2015–16 Tahiti Cup (also known as Coupe Tahiti Nui) was the 76th edition of the national cup in Tahitian football. AS Dragon won the title beating AS Vénus in the final, earning the right to represent Tahiti in the 2016-17 Coupe de France.

Participating teams

Ligue 1 (8 Teams) 

AS Aorai
AS Central Sport
AS Dragon
AS Manu-Ura
AS Pirae
AS Taiarapu
AS Tefana
AS Vénus

Ligue 2 (7 Teams) 

A.S. Arue 
AS Excelsior 
AS Jeunes Tahitiens
AS Olympique Mahina
A.S. Papenoo 
AS Tamarii Punaruu
A.S. Taravao 

Ligue 2 Moorea (4 Teams) 

A.S. Mira 
AS Temanava 
A.S. Tiare Anani 
AS Tiare Tahiti

First round

Second round

Round of 8

Semifinals

Final

References

Tahiti Cup
Tahiti
Tahiti
Ligue 1
Ligue 1